Novitiate is a 2017 American drama film written and directed by Maggie Betts, in her feature directorial debut. Starring Margaret Qualley, Melissa Leo, Morgan Saylor, Dianna Agron, Julianne Nicholson, Liana Liberato, Denis O'Hare, and Maddie Hasson, the film follows a young woman (Qualley) who starts to question her faith as she trains to become a nun.

Plot

Cathleen grows up in an unstable family in 1950s rural Tennessee; after attending a Catholic girls' school and watching her mother, Nora's, life falling apart she becomes attracted to the Catholic faith and decides to join a convent when she is seventeen. At the Sisters of the Beloved Rose convent she is under the control of the Mother Superior, who is cold and traditional. She imposes strict punishments on the young postulants spending their first months at the convent; comparatively, the nun overseeing the postulants' direct education, Sister Mary Grace, is warm and progressive, allowing them frivolity. However, Cathleen chooses to spend free time studying the Bible rather than spend time with the other girls.

When the Catholic Church is transitioning to Vatican II in this period, Mother Superior ignores the letters from the Archbishop requesting the implementation of the more liberal practices; Sister Mary Grace finds the notice and challenges the Mother Superior, but is ignored and leaves the convent. Cathleen completes her tenure as a postulant and becomes a novice, taking her Simple Vows. Soon, though, she starts to feel sexual desire, and becomes more reclusive and stops eating as self-punishment. Nora visits to tell Cathleen of her father's death and notices that she looks ill; Nora threatens the Mother Superior, who tells her that Cathleen is devoted to God and no longer her daughter. Cathleen soon collapses from her malnutrition and ends up in the infirmary, finding a confidante in Sister Emanuel there; the two young nuns grow closer until they have a physical encounter.  Cathleen's health improves.

The Archbishop has been informed that the Mother Superior is continuing with the traditional practices, and comes to the convent to force her to implement Vatican II. The Mother Superior questions her relationship with God and becomes more passive towards the novices. At a chapter of faults, Cathleen confesses her desires, but does not name Sister Emanuel, who still ignores her. The Mother Superior finally accepts Vatican II, beginning a new era at the convent.

The film ends with a note relating that after Vatican II a mass exodus of nuns occurred with 90,000 renouncing their vocation and leaving convents, a previously unseen scale of departure.

Cast
 Margaret Qualley as Sister Cathleen Harris
 Sasha Mason as Cathleen, age 12
 Eliza Mason as Cathleen, age 7
 Melissa Leo as Reverend Mother Marie Saint-Clair
 Julianne Nicholson as Nora Harris
 Dianna Agron as Sister Mary Grace
 Rebecca Dayan as Sister Emanuel
 Morgan Saylor as Sister Evelyn
 Maddie Hasson as Sister Sissy
 Liana Liberato as Sister Emily
 Eline Powell as Sister Candace
 Chelsea Lopez as Sister Charlotte
 Denis O'Hare as Archbishop McCarthy
 Chris Zylka as Chuck Harris
 Ashley Bell as Sister Margaret
 Marco St. John as Father Luca
 Marshall Chapman as Sister Louisa

Production
Novitiate is writer-director Maggie Betts's feature film directorial debut; her last projects were the 2010 documentary The Carrier, and the 2014 short Engram. In December 2015, it was announced that Melissa Leo, Dianna Agron, and Margaret Qualley had been cast in lead roles in the period drama film Novitiate, which would begin filming in January in Nashville, Tennessee. Kat Westergaard was hired as the director of photography. Novitiate marked the film scoring debut for composer Christopher Stark, who is an assistant professor of music at Washington University in St. Louis as of 2017. According to Stark, he had "about a week" to compose the score, the process of which "happen[ed] really fast".

Release
The film had its world premiere at the Sundance Film Festival on January 20, 2017. Shortly after, Sony Pictures Classics acquired U.S distribution rights to the film. It was released on October 27, 2017. It was released in Canada on November 3, 2017. Over ten weeks, the film grossed $580,346 at 163 North American theaters.

Reception

Critical response
On review aggregator Rotten Tomatoes, the film is certified fresh with a score of 86% based on 101 reviews, and an average rating of 7.2/10. The website's consensus reads, "Led by a gripping performance from Melissa Leo, Novitiate grapples uncompromisinglyand ultimately compellinglywith questions of faith and feminism." On Metacritic, it has an average score of 73/100 based on 30 critics, indicating "generally favorable reviews."

Accolades

References

External links
Official press kit
 
 

2017 films
2017 drama films
2017 directorial debut films
2017 independent films
2017 LGBT-related films
American drama films
Films shot in Tennessee
Sony Pictures Classics films
Films about Catholic nuns
Films about Catholicism
Films about Christianity
Films about sexual repression
Films produced by Trudie Styler
Sundance Film Festival award winners
2010s English-language films
2010s American films